The Canadian Intergovernmental Conference Secretariat (CICS) is an independent Canadian government agency enacted on November 29, 1973 by an Order in Council from the first ministers created for the purpose of facilitating intergovernmental meetings in Canada. It offers planning and administrative services for meetings between first ministers, ministers and deputy ministers of provincial and territorial governments, and multilateral meetings between ministers of the provinces, territories, and the federal government. The agency reports to the Parliament of Canada through the Minister of Intergovernmental Affairs. Each of the provinces and territories of Canada has their own similar agency.

See also
 First ministers conference

References

External links
 

1973 establishments in Canada
Federal departments and agencies of Canada
Government agencies established in 1973
Independent government agencies of Canada